Dialogue for Hungary (Párbeszéd or PM), also known in its shortened form Dialogue since September 2016, is a green political party in Hungary that was formed in February 2013 by eight MPs who left the Politics Can Be Different (LMP) party.

History 
The Dialogue for Hungary party had formed a coalition with the Together 2014 party; together, they won four seats in the national assembly and one seat in the European Parliament. Dialogue for Hungary took one seat from the four in the Hungarian parliament and has one representative in Brussels.

On 24 August 2016, spokesperson Bence Tordai announced that the shortened form of the party's name would change to "Dialogue". In September 2016, the party's logo was changed to Párbeszéd (Dialogue), instead of "PM" by removing the word Hungary.

In the spring of 2018 the party formed an alliance with the Hungarian Socialist Party (MSZP). In the 2019 local elections the party's chairman Gergely Karácsony was elected as Mayor of Budapest.

Symbols

Co-leaders

Election results

National Assembly

European Parliament

1 In an electoral alliance with Together (Együtt). They gained one seat, PM politician Benedek Jávor.

2 In an electoral alliance with Hungarian Socialist Party.

Further reading

See also
 List of political parties in Hungary

Footnotes

External links
Official website 

Political parties established in 2013
2013 establishments in Hungary
Feminism in Hungary
Feminist parties in Europe
Green liberalism
Green political parties in Hungary
Opposition to Viktor Orbán
Political parties in Hungary
Liberal parties in Hungary
Parties represented in the European Parliament
Pro-European political parties in Hungary
The Greens–European Free Alliance